Making Friends may refer to:

 Making Friends (album), a 1997 album by No Use for a Name
 Making Friends (film), a 1936 Fleischer Studios animated short film

See also
 Making Fiends (disambiguation)